Myron H. Atkinson, Jr. (September 22, 1927 – June 12, 2017) was an American politician who was a member of the North Dakota House of Representatives. As a Republican, he represented the 32nd district from 1969 to 1976. He was born in Bismarck, North Dakota and attended Bismarck Junior College and the University of North Dakota, where he received his law degree (JD). He was admitted to the North Dakota bar in 1951.

References

1927 births
2017 deaths
Republican Party members of the North Dakota House of Representatives
People from Bismarck, North Dakota